Taxes in Portugal are levied by both the national and regional governments of Portugal. Tax revenue in Portugal stood at 34.9% of GDP in 2018. The most important revenue sources include the income tax, social security contributions, corporate tax and the value added tax, which are all applied at the national level.

Income tax 
Employment income earned is subject to a progressive income tax, which applies to all who are in the workforce. Furthermore, a long list of tax allowances can be deducted, including a general deduction, health expenses, life and health insurance, and education expenses. In 2015 a tax of 3.5% was introduced on all employment and state pension income over €6,790. The personal income taxation system is as follows:

Benefits available to former and first time tax residents 
Under the Investment Tax Code, approved on September 23 2009, a new type of residency, for tax purposes was created under the Personal Income Tax Code, called non-habitual residency (NHR). This new tax residency type was created in order to attract to Portugal high-skilled professionals and pensioners obtaining foreign income.

Qualifying for NHR status 
A person, regardless of their nationality, may apply for registration as a non-habitual resident if the following conditions are fulfilled:

 The person is considered, for tax purposes, to be resident in Portuguese territory, in accordance with any of the criteria set out in Personal Income Tax Code in the year for which that person wishes to be taxed as NHR; 
 That person as not been considered to be resident in Portuguese territory in any of the five calendar years preceding the year for which that person wishes to be taxed as a non-habitual resident.

Personal Income Taxation

High Added Value Jobs 
Under Ministerial Order issued by the Ministry of Finance, the follow jobs are subject to flat personal income tax of 20%:

Corporate tax rate
The corporate tax rate applicable to companies in Portugal may vary, depending on which part of the Portuguese territory said companies are incorporated and domiciled.

Madeira International Business Centre 
Companies incorporated and headquartered in Madeira can apply for an International Business Centre (MIBC) license and, granted that they comply with substance requirements, benefit from a corporate tax rate of 5% on the taxable profit derived from economic activities engaged with non-resident entities or entities duly licensed within the MIBC.

Value added tax

Mainland Portugal

Three different VAT rates apply: normal, intermediate and reduced. There is a general rate of 23% (normal rate) for luxury goods, decorative plants, cut flowers, utensils and other equipment for firefighting and fire prevention, followed by a reduced rate of 13% for ordinary wine, spring, mineral, medicinal and carbonated water, and tickets for cultural events. This is followed by a further reduced rate of 6% on cereals, meat, shellfish, fruit, vegetables, and other essential foods, books, newspapers, medicines, passenger transport and hotel accommodation.
In 2014, the government introduced the fatura da sorte ("Lucky bill"), a lottery of tax-free cash and luxury cars awarded among consumers with VAT bills.
The goal is to bring into the formal economy the many unregistered and untaxed purchases.

Madeira 
The VAT rates in Madeira are 22% (normal rate), 12% (intermediate rate) and 5% (reduced rate).

Azores

The Azores has lower applicable VAT rates of 16%, 9% and 4%. Businesses with revenue of less than 10,000 Euros per year are exempt from VAT.

Social security contributions

All employment income is subject to social security contributions.

General Social Security Regime

Closed Social Security Regimes

Social Security Regime for Freelancers

Voluntary Social Security Insurance Scheme

See also 

 Economy of Portugal
List of taxes in Portugal
Portugal's List of Tax Havens

References

 
Portugal